Capelli Sport is an American sportswear and footwear company based in New York, United States, subsidiary of the GMA Accessories Inc. Founded in 2011 by Lebanon-born and New York-based entrepreneur George Altirs, Capelli Sport also has locations in Europe, the Middle East, and Africa under Capelli Europe GmbH, and in China under GMA Shanghai.

Capelli Sport has focused on the soccer market, producing kits, goalkeeper gloves, and balls, as well as casual wear – such as t-shirts, hoodies, jackets and leggings – and accessories, such as bags and hats. Capelli's footwear products include sneakers and football boots.

Overview
On January 24, 2017, Capelli Sport signed a corporate partnership with the Rochester Rhinos, a United Soccer League team, and their stadium was renamed Capelli Sport Stadium. Since January 20, 2021, Capelli Sport has held 40.1% of the shares of German soccer club MSV Duisburg.

Capelli Sport has equipped various soccer teams, most notably AEK Athens, MSV Duisburg, and the Lebanon national team.

Sponsorships
The following is a list of professional football teams sponsored by Capelli Sport:

Men
Clubs

 Austria Klagenfurt
 Barnechea
 Palestino
 Universidad de Concepción
 Jablonec
 HB Køge
 Herfølge Boldklub
 Viborg FF
 Alemannia Aachen
 BSG Wismut Gera
 MSV Duisburg
 1. FC Düren
 SpVgg Bayreuth
 Türkgücü München
 Viktoria Berlin
 Viktoria Köln
 Waldhof Mannheim
 Wehen Wiesbaden
 Inter Allies
 Kotoku Royals F.C.
 Atromitos
 Ergotelis
 Wing Yee (academy)
 Utenis Utena
 F91 Dudelange
 St. Lucia
 Los Cabos
 FC Dordrecht
 Pogoń Szczecin
 TSC Bačka Topola
 Brežice 1919
 Altınordu
 Amarillo Bombers
 Central Valley Fuego FC
 Colorado Springs Switchbacks FC
 Florida Tropics SC
 Kansas City Comets
 Utica City FC

National teams

Women
Clubs

 Barnechea
 HB Køge
 Barnsley
 Coventry United
 London City Lionesses
 
 MSV Duisburg
 Viktoria Berlin

National teams

References

External links

 

 
Athletic shoe brands
Clothing companies established in 2011
Sporting goods manufacturers of the United States
American brands
Sportswear brands
Privately held companies of the United States
American companies established in 2011
Shoe companies of the United States
2010s fashion
2020s fashion